City Weather Sailing is a 2008 Chinese and English language album by P.K. 14.

Track listing

 I wait for you in Nanjing's streets
 Wade the river
 Vanishing horizon
 Embellishments
 Fall of night
 Some surprises come too soon
 Unsung harbor
 Summer, after summer
 Orphaned isle
 The other side
 How majestic is the night
 Behind all ruptures
 Dead ahead
 Let things slide
 Wasteland
 Northern spiritual
 Lighthouse
 The balcony song

Credits

References

2008 albums
P.K. 14 albums